The Forest House in Tyrol or The Lodge in Tyrol (German: Das Forsthaus in Tirol) is a 1955 West German drama film directed by Hermann Kugelstadt and starring Wera Frydtberg, Helmuth Schneider and Dorothea Wieck.  Location shooting took place around Mittenwald, Innsbruck and Kitzbühel. Interiors were shot at temporary studio in Mittenwald. The film's sets were designed by the art director Max Seefelder. It was part of the boom in heimatfilm in post-war West Germany.

Synopsis
Richard Ferner returns to his Tyrolean home village after decades away, having mead a fortune from an African mine. He had fled many years before after stealing from his employer, and had abandoned his fiancée Dorothee, now the widow of a forester. He seeks to make amends to her by helping out her two children, preventing the son from engaging in petty theft in the same manner he once did and helping the daughter in her romance with the son of a hotelier.

Cast
 Wera Frydtberg as Maria Attinger 
 Helmuth Schneider as 	Michael Reimers, Hotelbesitzersohn
 Dorothea Wieck as Dorothee Attinger, Försterwitwe
 Albrecht Schoenhals as 	Richard Ferner
 Albert Hehn as Walter Brugg, Fahr- und Motorradhändler
 Ernst Waldow as 	Klinke aus Berlin
 Beppo Brem as 	Sepp, Bergführer
 Albert Florath as Hotelier Reimers, Michaels Vater
 Christian Doermer as 	Alfons Attinger, Marias Bruder
 Charles Regnier as 	Milazzo, Juwelier
 Hubert von Meyerinck as 	von Langer, Staatsanwalt 
 Gert Fröbe as 	Bäuerle, Kaufmann
 Michl Lang as 	Karl, Hausdiener
 Jupp Hussels as 	Herr Küppers, Vater von Margot
 Hans Hermann Schaufuß as 	Kipling, Sparkassendirektor 
 Bobby Todd as 	Dr. Hausschild, Arzt	
 Gusti Kreissl as 	Frau Küppers, Margots Mutter
 Ingeborg Christiansen as 	Margot Küppers, Tochter
 Viktor Afritsch as Ringeis, Apotheker

References

Bibliography
 Bock, Hans-Michael & Bergfelder, Tim. The Concise CineGraph. Encyclopedia of German Cinema. Berghahn Books, 2009.
 Ivanova, Mariana. Cinema of Collaboration: DEFA Coproductions and International Exchange in Cold War Europe. Berghahn Books, 2019.

External links 
 

1955 films
1955 drama films
German drama films
West German films
1950s German-language films
Films directed by Hermann Kugelstadt
1950s German films
Films shot in Bavaria
Films shot in Austria
Films set in Austria

de:Das Forsthaus in Tirol